Barjinder Singh Hamdard is the managing editor of the Punjabi newspaper Daily Ajit and he is also an ex-parliamentarian of India's upper house, Rajya Sabha. He is the son of famous Punjabi journalist and writer Sadhu Singh Hamdard.

Punjabi politics
Hamdard led a coalition in opposition to Amarinder Singh after Singh took office and withdrew government advertising from Ajit newspapers.

References

Punjabi people
Indian newspaper editors
Living people
People from Jalandhar
Year of birth missing (living people)
Rajya Sabha members from Punjab, India
Recipients of the Padma Shri in literature & education
Recipients of the Padma Bhushan in literature & education
20th-century Indian journalists
Indian male journalists
Journalists from Punjab, India
Shiromani Akali Dal politicians